

History 
Emerging from the Graduiertenkolleg “Das Neue Europa”, the Berlin Graduate School of Social Sciences has been founded in 2002. For a five-year period the BGSS has been a pilot project by the German Academic Exchange Service (German Deutsche Akademische Austauschdienst). In 2007 the Graduate School became an integral part of the Department of Social Sciences at Humboldt University Berlin. Since November 2007 the doctoral program is funded by the Excellence Initiative of the German federal and state governments.

Research areas 
Research at the BGSS is focused on the comparative analysis of social inclusion and democratic performance of modern societies. Recently, the role of knowledge in democratic societies has been added as a third research focus.

Varieties of inclusion
This research area is concerned with the question whether and how modern societies are able to cope with contemporary problems of inclusion and exclusion, discrimination and diversity, heterogeneity and individualization. Topics are:
 Social inequality, well-being and justice
 Social protest and social conflict
 Migration and cultural diversity
 Conflict in and management of collective identities

Varieties of democracy
This research area looks at the conditions of the establishment, stability and development of democratic structures in modern societies. Topics are:
 Performance of mature and young democracies
 Processes of democratization, and the resilience of autocracy
 Multilevel and multinational policy
 Political institutions, political conflict, and the welfare state

Varieties of knowledge
This research area is concerned with the role of scientific and non-scientific knowledge in the reproduction of democratic societies. Topics include:
 Scientific knowledge in processes of policy-making
 The impact of science on processes of inclusion and democratization
 Communicating knowledge in public spheres
 The governance of science

Networks 
The BGSS collaborates with the following non-university research institutions exchanging doctoral and senior researchers. 
Social Science Research Center Berlin (German Wissenschaftszentrum Berlin für Sozialforschung)
Centre Marc Bloch
Institute for Research Information and Quality Assurance (German Institut für Forschungsinformation und Qualitätssicherung)
Hertie School of Governance
German Institute for Economic Research (German Deutsches Institut für Wirtschaftsforschung)

The BGSS is host university of European PhD in Socio-Economic and Statistical Studies (SESS.EuroPhD), a consortium of European universities awarding the Doctor Europeus or European PhD.
Since 2010, Craig Calhoun is Einstein Visiting Fellow at BGSS.

Selection of faculty members 
 Prof. Dr. Klaus Eder (Director of BGSS)
 Prof. Dr. Jutta Allmendinger (WZB)
 Prof. Dr. Hans Bertram
 Prof. Dr. Talja Blokland
Prof. Dr. Hans Blokland
 Prof. Dr. Jürgen Gerhards
 Prof. Dr. Ellen Immergut
 Prof. Dr. Markus Jachtenfuchs
 Prof. Dr. Ruud Koopmans
 Prof. Dr. Wolfgang Merkel (WZB)
 Prof. Dr. Herfried Münkler
 Prof. Dr. Hildegard Maria Nickel
 Prof. Dr. Michael Zürn (WZB)

Doctoral researcher activities 
In 2010 doctoral researchers of BGSS and WZB organized the “Berlin Summer School in Social Sciences – Linking Theory and Empirical Research”. They also publish an Online Working Paper Series.

References

Sources 
Website of Berlin Graduate School of Social Sciences: Faculty  retrieved on August 23, 2011.
 DAAD
 European PhD Portal
WZB

External links 
Berlin Graduate School of Social Sciences
Humboldt Center of Social and Political Research (HCSP)
TAZ: Gartenpflege über den Zaun hinweg
 Tagesspiegel, Berliner Schule der Demokratie, 16.10.2011

Humboldt University of Berlin